Several articles, categories, and lists cover the topic of reusable containers:
 Container - many types are reusable
 Reusable packaging
 Resealable packaging
 Reuse of bottles
 Reusable shopping bag

See also
 :Category:Containers